is a Japanese voice actress affiliated with Himawari Theatre Group. She joined the group at the age of three and did acting in various television dramas. She later became a voice actress and was cast in her first lead role as Aoi Aioi in Her Blue Sky. Some of her other major roles include Yume Minami in SSSS.Dynazenon, Cosette Schneider/Destiny in Takt Op. Destiny, Mai Kawai in Police in a Pod, and Takina Inoue in Lycoris Recoil.

Biography
Shion Wakayama was born in Chiba Prefecture on February 10, 1998. She joined Himawari Theatre Group at the age of three. Being a fan of video games, Wakayama wanted to pursue a career in voice acting. In 2019, she was cast in her first major role in an anime with Aoi Aioi in Her Blue Sky.

In 2022, Wakayama was cast as Mai Kawai in Police in a Pod and Takina Inoue in Lycoris Recoil. In 2023, she was a recipient of the Best New Actor Award at the 17th Seiyu Awards.

Filmography

Anime
2019
 Gundam Build Divers Re:Rise as Hinata Mukai

2021
 Mushoku Tensei: Jobless Reincarnation as Shizuka Nanahoshi
 SSSS.Dynazenon as Yume Minami
 Farewell, My Dear Cramer as Sawa Echizen
 Takt Op. Destiny as Cosette Schneider/Destiny

2022
 Police in a Pod as Mai Kawai
 Akebi's Sailor Uniform as Tomono Kojou
 Lycoris Recoil as Takina Inoue

2023
 The Girl I Like Forgot Her Glasses as Ai Mie

Films
2019
 Her Blue Sky as Aoi Aioi

2021
 Farewell, My Dear Cramer: First Touch as Sawa Echizen
 Bright: Samurai Soul as Sonya

2023
 Gridman Universe as Yume Minami

Video games
2021
 World Flipper as Sariha
 Azur Lane as Yume Minami

2023
Grandchase:Dimensional Chaser as Ganymede Jupiter

Dubbing
 Bambi II as Thumper's Sister

References

External links
 Official agency profile 
 

1998 births
Japanese child actresses
Japanese video game actresses
Japanese voice actresses
Living people
Seiyu Award winners
Voice actresses from Chiba Prefecture